Chayuanchang (Chinese: 察院场) is a station of Line 4, Suzhou Rail Transit. The station is located in Gusu District of Suzhou. It has been in use since April 15, 2017, the same time of the operation of Line 4.

References 

Railway stations in China opened in 2017
Railway stations in Jiangsu